Leslie Marian Uggams (born May 25, 1943) is an American actress and singer. Beginning her career as a child in the early 1950s, Uggams is recognized for portraying Kizzy Reynolds in the television miniseries Roots (1977), earning Golden Globe and Emmy Award nominations for her performance. She had earlier been highly acclaimed for the Broadway musical Hallelujah, Baby!, winning a Theatre World Award in 1967 and the Tony Award for Best Actress in a Musical in 1968. Later in her career, Uggams received renewed notice with appearances alongside Ryan Reynolds as Blind Al in Deadpool (2016) & Deadpool 2 (2018) and in a recurring role on Empire.

Life and career

Early life
Uggams was born in Harlem, the daughter of Juanita Ernestine (Smith), a Cotton Club chorus girl/dancer, and Harold Coyden Uggams, an elevator operator and maintenance man, who was a singer with the Hall Johnson choir. She attended the Professional Children's School of New York and Juilliard. Her aunt, singer Eloise C. Uggams, encouraged her musical training. One of her grandfathers was Coyden H. Uggams, twice pastor of Zion Presbyterian Church in Charleston, South Carolina from 1902 to 1906 and 1913 to 1919.

Early work
Uggams started in show business as a child in 1951, playing the niece of Ethel Waters on Beulah. That same year she appeared as a featured performer at the famed Apollo Theater in Harlem, alongside Ella Fitzgerald. She made her professional debut at the age of six on Jack Barry's NBC show "Stars And Stardust." Following that, she performed on "Arthur Godfrey's Talent Scouts". Uggams got her biggest break on The Lawrence Welk Show and was a regular on Sing Along with Mitch, starring record producer-conductor Mitch Miller. In 1954, ten-year-old Uggams made a record for MGM, which included a reworking of the song Santa Baby as "Uncle Santa," with words suitable for a child. In 1960, she sang, off-screen, "Give Me That Old Time Religion" in the film Inherit the Wind. Uggams came to be recognized by TV audiences as an upcoming teen talent in 1958 on the musical quiz show series Name That Tune. A record executive was in the studio audience and signed her to a contract. Her records "One More Sunrise" (an English-language cover of Ivo Robic's "Morgen", 1959) and "House Built on Sand" made Billboard magazine's charts.

Television and film
She appeared in her own television variety show, The Leslie Uggams Show in 1969. This was the first network variety show to be hosted by a black person since The Nat King Cole Show of the mid-1950s. She had a lead role in the 1977 miniseries Roots, for which she received an Emmy nomination, as Kizzy. In 1979, she starred as Lillian Rogers Parks in the Emmy-winning miniseries Backstairs at the White House. She also made guest appearances on such television programs as Family Guy (as herself), I Spy, Hollywood Squares, The Muppet Show, The Love Boat and Magnum, P.I.. In 1996, Uggams played the role of Rose Keefer on All My Children. She won a 1983 Daytime Emmy Award as a host of the NBC game show Fantasy.

Her film career includes roles in Skyjacked (1972), Black Girl (1972) and Poor Pretty Eddie (1975), in which she played a popular singer who, upon being stranded in the deep South, is abused and humiliated by the perverse denizens of a backwoods town. She later appeared in Sugar Hill (1994) opposite Wesley Snipes, and played Blind Al in Deadpool (2016) in February 2016. In April 2016, she portrayed Leah Walker, the bipolar mother of Lucious Lyon in the hit Fox series Empire. Uggams appeared as Sadie in the 2017 television film The Immortal Life of Henrietta Lacks, and in 2018, she returned as Blind Al in Deadpool 2.

She is an active Democrat and hosted a 1984 Democratic Telethon. In 1999 and 2021, she guest starred in two episodes of Family Guy. Additionally, she is also slated to reprise her role as Blind Al in Deadpool 3.

In 2023, Uggams voiced a character, Grandma, in My Dad the Bounty Hunter.

Stage

Uggams was picked to star in Hallelujah, Baby! after Lena Horne declined the role of Georgina. The musical premiered on Broadway in 1967 and "created a new star" in Uggams. She won the Tony Award for Best Actress in a musical (in a tie with Patricia Routledge). She appeared on Broadway in the revue Blues in the Night in 1982 and in the musical revue of the works of Jerry Herman, Jerry's Girls in 1985. Uggams replaced Patti LuPone as Reno Sweeney in the Lincoln Center revival of Cole Porter's musical Anything Goes on Broadway in March 1989. She had played Reno in a US tour in 1988–1989. Later Broadway roles include Muzzy in Thoroughly Modern Millie (2003–2004) and Ethel Thayer in On Golden Pond at the Kennedy Center in 2004 and on Broadway at the Cort Theatre in 2005.
In 2001, she appeared in the August Wilson play King Hedley II, receiving a nomination for the Tony Award, Best Actress in a Play. In January 2009, Uggams played Lena Horne in a production of the stage musical Stormy Weather at the Pasadena Playhouse in California, directed by Michael Bush and choreographed by Randy Skinner. In June 2012, Uggams played Muzzy in a production of Thoroughly Modern Millie at The Muny in St. Louis. In 2014, she starred as Rose in Connecticut Repertory Theatre's Nutmeg Summer Series production of Gypsy.

Personal life
Uggams has been married to her longtime manager Grahame Pratt since 1965, at the time a rare high-profile interracial marriage. “It was not as hard as I expected it to be,” Uggams says. “I think the reason is that Grahame was not an American white man. But of course we did get mail.” Uggams met her husband at the Professional Children's School of New York, where they were both students. The couple met again while she was performing in Sydney during one of Uggams's celebrity tours in Australia and he became her manager afterward. After their wedding, the couple decided to reside in New York, which was then more tolerant of interracial relationships. The couple are parents to daughter Danielle, born in 1970, and son Justice, born in 1975.

Filmography

Film

Television

Discography
The Eyes of God (Columbia CS8174, 1959)
LESLIE UGGAMS ON TV with Mitch Miller's sing along chorus (Columbia CL1706, 1962)
So in Love! (Columbia CS8871, 1963)
A Time to Love (Atlantic 8128, 1966)
What's an Uggams? (Atlantic SD8196, 1968)
Just to Satisfy You (Atlantic SD8241, 1969)
Leslie (Columbia CS9936, 1970)
Try to See It My Way (Sonday SL8000, 1972)
Leslie Uggams (Motown M6846S1, 1975)
Leslie Uggams: On My Way to You: Songs of Alan and Marilyn Bergman (2003)

Awards and nominations
Supersisters trading card set
 1979: (one of the cards featured Uggams's name and picture)

Theater World Award

1967: Theater World Award for Hallelujah Baby
Tony Award
1968: Winner for Leading Actress in a Musical for Hallelujah Baby
2001: Nominated for Leading Actress in a Play for King Hedley II
Daytime Emmy
1983: Winner as Outstanding Host or Hostess in a Variety Series for Fantasy
1984: Nominated as Outstanding Host or Hostess in a Variety Series for Fantasy
Ovation Awards
2009: Nominated for Lead Actress in a Musical for the role of Lena Horne in the Pasadena Playhouse production of Stormy Weather
Honorary Degrees
2015: Awarded an honorary Doctor of Fine Arts degree from the University of Connecticut
2019: Awarded an honorary Doctor of Fine Arts degree from the University of Michigan

References

External links

 Official website
 
 
 
 Leslie Uggams – Downstage Center interview at American Theatre Wing.org
 

1943 births
Living people
Apex Records artists
Tony Award winners
American film actresses
American television actresses
African-American actresses
20th-century African-American women singers
Actresses from New York City
American musical theatre actresses
20th-century American actresses
20th-century American women singers
20th-century American singers
21st-century American actresses
21st-century American women singers
21st-century American singers
New York (state) Democrats
21st-century African-American women singers